Town commissioners were governing bodies in smaller towns in Ireland from 1828 to 2001.

Town commissioners may also refer to:
 Town commissioners (Isle of Man), governing bodies of certain towns in the Isle of Man
 Governing bodies of certain towns in the United States; see 
 City commission government for the type of government; and
 Town#United States for the difference between "town" and "city" (which varies by state)